The 2012 Pacific Life Pac-12 Conference men's basketball tournament was played on March 7–10, 2012 at Staples Center in Los Angeles, California. The tournament champion became the NCAA tournament automatic qualifier from the conference. The pairings will be announced following the completion of the regular season on March 4, 2012. The first three rounds was all broadcast on FSN with the championship game on CBS.   The Pac-12 announced, on March 1, that Men's and Women's tournament games that were not televised would be streamed on YouTube. Also streamed live on YouTube was a post-game press conferences for the semifinals and championship games. In its first season in the Pac-12, No. 6 seeded Colorado defeated No. 4 seeded Arizona 53–51 for the title and the automatic bid to the NCAA National Championship Tournament. Colorado (along with USC in 2009) has been the lowest seeded team ever to win in this tournament's history. Colorado also was the first team ever to win four games to become the champion of this tournament (because the 6th seed plays in the first of four rounds).

Seeds
Teams was seeded by conference record, with a tiebreaker system used to seed teams with identical conference records.

Schedule

Bracket

Tournament notes

 This was the first tournament ever held under the "Pac-12" name, after Colorado and Utah joined the conference on July 1, 2011.
 March 7, 2012 – Josiah Turner of Arizona was suspended indefinitely from the basketball team for a violation of team rules, announced by head coach Sean Miller.
 This was the lowest-scoring game for both teams in a tournament championship game.
 Colorado got the automatic bid to the 2012 NCAA men's Division I basketball tournament, with California getting an at-large bid.
 Arizona beat Oregon State for the 6th time in Pac-10/12 tournament history, the most wins any university has over any other, (Arizona is now 6-0 all time vs. OSU in the tournament).
 Stanford and ASU combined for 26 3-pt. field goals which set a current tournament record (15 and 11).
 Oregon State and Washington combined for a record game low % of free throws made, only 49.2% (29 of 59) (OSU was 17 of 32; UW was 12 of 27).
 In the Colorado vs. Arizona game, there were only 12 assists (6 for each team), a record game low for a combined total.
 Austin Dufault of Colorado had 15 personal fouls throughout the tournament (4 games) setting a Pac-12 Tournament record.
 André Roberson of Colorado had a record 41 rebounds (4 games) for one tournament.
 Washington, Arizona, Stanford, and Oregon were invited to the 2012 National Invitation Tournament. Stanford was the N.I.T. champion.
 Washington State and Oregon State were invited to the 2012 College Basketball Invitational.
 This was the first time since 1958 that a Pac-12 regular season conference champion was not selected for the NCAA tournament.

All-Tournament Team
 Carlon Brown, Colorado
 Jared Cunningham, Oregon State (2nd time, 2011)
 Kyle Fogg, Arizona
 Solomon Hill, Arizona
 Jesse Perry, Arizona
 André Roberson, Colorado

Most Outstanding Player
 Carlon Brown, Colorado

2012 Hall of Honor inductees

The induction ceremony took place on Saturday, March 10 during the Pac-12 Hall of Honor breakfast. Inductees were:
 Richard Jefferson (Arizona)
 Kurt Nimphius (Arizona State)
 Lamond Murray (California)
 Burdette Haldorson (Colorado)
 Jim Barnett (Oregon)
 A.C. Green (Oregon State)
 George Selleck (Stanford)
 Ed O'Bannon (UCLA)
 Sam Barry (Coach) (USC)
 Arnie Ferrin (Utah)
 George Irvine (Washington)
 Steve Puidokas (Washington State)

See also
2012 NCAA Men's Division I Basketball Tournament

References

External links
 2012 Pac-12 Pacific Life Tournament

Pac-12 Conference men's basketball tournament
-2011 Pac-12 Conference Menand#39;s Basketball Tournament